Pat McNamara (December 2, 1925 – October 24, 2011) was an American speed skater. He competed at the 1952 and 1956 Winter Olympics.

References

1925 births
2011 deaths
American male speed skaters
Olympic speed skaters of the United States
Speed skaters at the 1952 Winter Olympics
Speed skaters at the 1956 Winter Olympics
Sportspeople from Minneapolis